Alejandro Santo Domingo (born 13 February 1977) is a Colombian-American billionaire financier and philanthropist. As of March 2022, his estimated net worth was US$2.5 billion.

Early life
He is the son of Colombian billionaire Julio Mario Santo Domingo and his second wife, Colombian socialite Beatrice Dávila. He is the brother of Andres Santo Domingo Dávila and half-brother of Julio Mario Santo Domingo Braga (1958 – March 2009), who was the only child of Julio Mario Santo Domingo and his first wife, Brazilian socialite Edyala Braga.

He was educated at the Hotchkiss School, followed by a bachelor's degree in history from Harvard University.

Career
His work centers on managing his family's conglomerate, the Santo Domingo Group. He is the chairman of Grupo Empresarial Bavaria S.A., a privately owned subsidiary of SABMiller, of which he is vice-chairman for Latin America. His business partner is his maternal cousin, Carlos Alejandro Pérez Dávila, a former Goldman Sachs investment banker who helps him manage the family portfolio. Along with said cousin, he is also the managing director of the New York-based Quadrant Capital Advisors, Inc. In 2009, Santo Domingo was elected to the Board of Trustees on the Metropolitan Museum of Art.

Philanthropy
He is a director of Colombia's Endeavor, an international non-profit development organization that aims to find and support high-impact entrepreneurs in emerging markets and is member of the Latin America Conservation Council of The Nature Conservancy. He is a director of DKMS Americas, a non-profit organization and the largest bone marrow donor center in the world. With over 3.6 million registered donors, DKMS is leading the fight against blood cancer by empowering people to take action, give bone marrow, and save lives.
 
He is active in the family's foundation, which is a major player in helping Colombia's poor. He is also a generous donor and has championed ecological and conservancy causes.

Personal life
Santo Domingo has a house in Southampton, New York.
During the years he has been seen with several famous socialite girlfriends, which have included heiress Amanda Hearst, editor Karen Larrain and models Eugenia Silva and Julie Henderson.

In July 2015, his engagement to Lady Charlotte Anne Wellesley, daughter of Charles Wellesley, 9th Duke of Wellington and Princess Antonia of Prussia, great-great-granddaughter of the late German emperor Wilhelm II, was announced. They were married in Illora, near Granada, Spain, on 28 May 2016. They have two children, born in 2017 and 2019.

See also
 Santo Domingo family

References

External links
 Alejandro Santo Domingo, SABMiller
 Alejandro Santo Domingo, The Americas Group

1977 births
Living people
Businesspeople from New York City
Harvard University alumni
Hotchkiss School alumni
Colombian businesspeople
Colombian billionaires
Colombian chief executives
Alejandro
21st-century American businesspeople
American people of Colombian descent
People named in the Pandora Papers